The Caatinga Ecological Corridor is an ecological corridor in the caatinga biome of northeast Brazil.

History

The decree creating the Caatinga Ecological Corridor was signed on 28 April 2006 by the Minister of the Environment, Marina Silva.
The ordnance was published on 4 May 2006.
It was the second officially recognized ecological corridor, the first being the Capivara-Confusões Ecological Corridor, created in March 2006.
It is designed to interconnect eight conservation units and 40 municipalities in the states of Pernambuco, Bahia, Sergipe, Alagoas and Piauí. It excludes urban areas.

The Brazilian Institute of Environment and Renewable Natural Resources (IBAMA) is responsible for management.
It was expected that all municipalities would be subject to government regulations to conserve biodiversity and promote sustainable development, including replanting degraded areas.
Priority areas for conservation, sustainable use and sharing of the benefits of biodiversity are Angical, Aiuaba, Betânia, Curaçá, Gararu/Belo Monte, Mirandiba, Paus Brancos (Quixeramobim), Queimada Nova, Remanso, Serra Negra, western Pernambuco, Petrolina, Raso da Catarina, Rodelas, Serra Talhada and Monte Alegre.

Conservation units

Conservation units in the corridor when created were the Catimbau National Park, Serra Negra Biological Reserve, Raso da Catarina Ecological Station, Serra Branca / Raso da Catarina Environmental Protection Area,  Cocorobó Area of Relevant Ecological Interest, Lagoa do Frio Municipal Nature Park, Cantidiano Valqueiro Barros Private Natural Heritage Reserve and Maurício Dantas Private Natural Heritage Ecological Reserve.
It also included their buffer zones, interstices and areas to be created later.

Notes

Sources

Ecological corridors of Brazil
2006 establishments in Brazil
Protected areas of Pernambuco
Protected areas of Bahia
Protected areas of Sergipe
Protected areas of Alagoas 
Protected areas of Piauí